William James Baker MM (1882 – 22 October 1916) was an English professional footballer who made over 190 appearances as a wing half in the Southern League for Plymouth Argyle between 1909 and 1915. He also played in the United States and South Africa.

Personal life 
Baker was married. He served in the Football Battalion of the Middlesex Regiment during the First World War and rose to the rank of sergeant. He was wounded in action at Vimy Ridge in June 1916 and received the Military Medal. On 22 October 1916, Baker was killed by German artillery fire near Serre-lès-Puisieux during the Battle of the Somme and is commemorated at Sucrerie Military Cemetery at Colincamps.

Career statistics

References

1882 births
1916 deaths
Footballers from Plymouth, Devon
English footballers
Association football wing halves
Green Waves F.C. players
Plymouth Argyle F.C. players
Southern Football League players
Middlesex Regiment soldiers
British military personnel killed in the Battle of the Somme
Recipients of the Military Medal
Date of birth missing
English expatriate sportspeople in the United States
English expatriate sportspeople in South Africa
British Army personnel of World War I
English expatriate footballers
Expatriate soccer players in the United States
Expatriate soccer players in South Africa